Anatoly Alekseevich Chukanov (10 May 1954 – 12 June 2021) was a Soviet and Russian cyclist. He was part of the Soviet team that won the 100 km team time trial at the 1976 Summer Olympics and 1977 UCI Road World Championships.

He was born in Russia, but later moved to Ukraine. After retirement he was teaching sport-related subjects at the East Ukraine Volodymyr Dahl National University. He was awarded the Order of the Badge of Honour.

References

1954 births
2021 deaths
People from Millerovsky District
Olympic cyclists of the Soviet Union
Olympic gold medalists for the Soviet Union
Cyclists at the 1976 Summer Olympics
Olympic medalists in cycling
Soviet male cyclists
Russian male cyclists
UCI Road World Champions (elite men)
Medalists at the 1976 Summer Olympics
Sportspeople from Rostov Oblast